Colour Temple is the first studio album by progressive metal band Vanden Plas, released in late 1994 through Limb Music and in June 1995 through Dream Circle Records; a two-disc edition was reissued in 2002 through Inside Out Music, which included the band's 1996 acoustic EP AcCult.

Track listing

Personnel
Andy Kuntz – lead vocals, background vocals, production
Stephan Lill – guitar, background vocals, production
Günter Werno – keyboard, background vocals, production
Andreas Lill – drums, production
Torsten Reichert – bass, production
Robert Kohlmeyer – background vocals, production
Miriam Bonmarchand – background vocals (track 6)

References

Vanden Plas (band) albums
1994 albums
Inside Out Music albums